Xia Yu may refer to:

Yu the Great, also known as Xia Yu, legendary founder of the Xia dynasty
Xia Yu (actor) (born 1978), Chinese actor
Ha Yu (actor) (born 1946), or Xia Yu, Hong Kong actor